Leicester Student Magazine is the student newspaper at the University of Leicester, England. The publication operates almost entirely online, covering local and university-centered news, as well as arts, entertainment, lifestyle, fictional works and student opinion articles.

Leicester Student Magazine, under previous names, has featured a wide range of interviews with high-profile figures throughout its history, from Robert Mugabe and Yasser Arafat to more recent public figures such as Aaron Porter, Peter Soulsby and Dr Alex George.

The President, a position assumed by Grace Robinson from Ella Johnson in July 2022, is elected by the magazine's student members and oversees the editorial team and elected committee. The committee is elected by magazine members via the University of Leicester Students' Union and primarily oversee day-to-day operations including external liaison, social media management and student membership, while the internally-elected editorial board seek to offer guidance and support to student writers of varying experience and ability.

History
Leicester Student Magazine (with previous names including The Ripple and Galaxy Press) was originally founded by Malcolm Bradbury in 1957 under its original name The Wave. Past editors include Brian Abbs (1957–58), Richard Swann (1971–72), Marc Heal (1983–84), Andrew Biswell (1993–94) and Aaron Porter (2005–06).

In October 2012, the publication launched a website for the first time, providing daily news updates and other content in addition to the print editions published each term.

In May 2013, students at the University of Leicester elected President Christopher Everett as the first President of The Ripple. The newly created role of President was designed so that the future editor would no longer be concerned with both content and the day-to-day running of the publication, and is tasked with undertaking responsibilities such as developing strategic goals for The Ripple, organising and leading the Ripple executive, communicating with the Students' Union, ensuring funding and distribution for The Ripple, and organising extra-publicatory activities for the Ripple'''s members.

In July 2020, the student publication was re-branded to Leicester Student Magazine by Zainab Bikar and Ella Johnson, following a period of society inactivity, with a notable shift into digital publication and increased social media presence.Leicester Student Magazine Instagram The current website was launched on 20 September 2020.

Leicester Student Magazine currently follows a leadership structure similar to that established in 2013, without the implementation of an Editor-in-Chief. Instead, a team of editors oversee the main categories - News, Features, Arts & Culture, Sport, Lifestyle and Opinion - while a democratically elected committee oversee the operational side of the publication.

Recent recognition includes receiving the 2021 Highly Commended Newcomer Publication accolade within the Midlands by the Student Publication Association, as well as a host of short-listings in the national awards.

In the news
In early 2006, the BBC revealed that the word "moony" was first used in print by The Ripple as part of the slang used during the 1987 RAG week, and led to the Oxford English Dictionary attributing the paper as the source of the word. This was then followed by a feature on The Ripple as part of the BBC show Balderdash and Piffle, screened on Easter Sunday, 16 April 2006.The Ripple received national press attention again in November 2006 after speaking out against an attempt by the National Union Of Students to restrict sales of a number of lad mags in the students' union shop.

References

External links
http://www.issuu.com/theripple/ - Read The Ripple''

University of Leicester
Student newspapers published in the United Kingdom
Publications established in 1957